Heterococcus is a genus of yellow-green algae in the family Heteropediaceae.

Pirula is regarded as a synonym.

Species

 Heterococcus africanus 
 Heterococcus akinetus 
 Heterococcus anguinus 
 Heterococcus arcticus
 Heterococcus botrys
 Heterococcus brevicellularis 
 Heterococcus caespitosus 
 Heterococcus canadensis
 Heterococcus capitatus
 Heterococcus chodatii 
 Heterococcus clavatus
 Heterococcus conicus
 Heterococcus corniculatus
 Heterococcus crassulus 
 Heterococcus curvatus
 Heterococcus curvirostrus
 Heterococcus dissociatus
 Heterococcus endolithicus
 Heterococcus erectus
 Heterococcus filiformis
 Heterococcus flavescens 
 Heterococcus fontanus
 Heterococcus fuornensis 
 Heterococcus furcatus
 Heterococcus gemmatus
 Heterococcus geniculatus
 Heterococcus granulatus
 Heterococcus implexus
 Heterococcus leptosiroides
 Heterococcus longicellularis
 Heterococcus mainxii 
 Heterococcus marietanii 
 Heterococcus mastigophorus
 Heterococcus maximus
 Heterococcus moniliformis 
 Heterococcus nepalensis
 Heterococcus papillosus
 Heterococcus plectenchymaticus
 Heterococcus pleurococcoides
 Heterococcus polymorphus 
 Heterococcus presolanensis
 Heterococcus protonematoides 
 Heterococcus quadratus
 Heterococcus ramosissimus
 Heterococcus stellatus
 Heterococcus stigeoclonioides
 Heterococcus subterrestris
 Heterococcus tectiformis
 Heterococcus teleutosporoides
 Heterococcus tellii
 Heterococcus thermalis
 Heterococcus tiroliensis
 Heterococcus undulatus
 Heterococcus unguis
 Heterococcus vesiculosus
 Heterococcus virginis
 Heterococcus viridis
 Heterococcus zonatus

References

Xanthophyceae
Heterokont genera